Morning glory (also written as morning-glory) is the common name for over 1,000 species of flowering plants in the family Convolvulaceae, whose current taxonomy and systematics are in flux. Morning glory species belong to many genera, some of which are:
 Argyreia
 Astripomoea
 Calystegia
 Convolvulus
 Ipomoea (the largest genus)
 Lepistemon
 Merremia
 Operculina
 Rivea
 Stictocardia
As the name suggests, most morning glory flowers unfurl into full bloom in the early morning. The flowers usually start to fade a few hours before the corolla begins to display visible curling. They prefer full solar exposure throughout the day, and mesic soils. Some morning glories, such as Ipomoea muricata, Ipomoea alba, and Ipomoea macrorhiza, are night-blooming flowers.

History 

Ipomoea nil, a species of morning glory, was first known in China for its medicinal uses, due to the laxative properties of its seeds.

Ancient Mesoamerican civilizations used the morning glory species Ipomoea alba to convert the latex from the Castilla elastica tree and also the guayule plant to produce bouncing rubber balls. The sulfur in the morning glory's juice served to vulcanize the rubber, a process antedating Charles Goodyear's discovery by at least 3,000 years. Aztec priests in Mexico were also known to use the plant's hallucinogenic properties (see Rivea corymbosa).

Invasive species 
In some places, such as Australian bushland, some species of morning glories develop thick roots and tend to grow in dense thickets. They can quickly spread by way of long, creeping stems. By crowding out, blanketing, and smothering other plants, morning glory has turned into a serious invasive weed problem.

In parts of the US, species such as Calystegia sepium (hedge bindweed), Ipomoea purpurea (common morning glory) and Ipomoea indica (blue morning glory) have shown to be invasive. In fact, as of 2021, most non-native species of Ipomoea are currently illegal to cultivate, possess, and sell in the U.S. state of Arizona, and before 4 January 2020, this ban applied to native species, too. This is because some species of Convolvulaceae (like Convolvulus arvensis and Ipomoea × leucantha) have been known to cause problems in crops, especially in cotton fields. Ipomoea aquatica is a federal noxious weed, though some states, like Texas, have acknowledged its status as a vegetable and allow it to be grown.

Cultivation 
In cultivation, most are treated as perennial plants in frost-free areas and as annual plants in colder climates, but some species tolerate winter cold.  Some species are strictly annual (e.g. Ipomoea nil), producing many seeds, and some perennial species (e.g. I. indica) are propagated by cuttings.  Some moonflowers, which flower at night, are also in the morning glory family.

Because of their fast growth, twining habit, attractive flowers, and tolerance for poor, dry soils, some morning glories are excellent vines for creating summer shade on building walls when trellised, thus keeping the building cooler and reducing heating and cooling costs.

Popular varieties in contemporary western cultivation include 'Sunspots', 'Heavenly Blue',  moonflower, cypress vine, and cardinal climber.  The cypress vine is a hybrid, with the cardinal climber as one parent.

Many morning glories self-seed in the garden. They have a hard seed coat, which delays germination until late spring. Germination may be improved by soaking in warm water.

Morning glory has been a favorite flower in Japan for many a long century.  The cultivation started in the Nara period (8th century).  The big booms of the selective breeding of the morning glory happened in the Edo era(17-19th century). The large-flowered morning glory was broadly cultivated as a hobby flower. The varied Japanese morning glory (変化朝顔 Henka-asagao or mutant morning glory) was created.

Culinary uses 

Ipomoea aquatica, known as water spinach, water morning glory, water convolvulus, ong-choy, kang-kung, or swamp cabbage, is popularly used as a green vegetable, especially in East and Southeast Asian cuisines.  In the US, I. aquatica is a federal noxious weed, and can be illegal to grow, import, possess, or sell without a permit. A market exists, though, for the plant's powerful culinary potential. As of 2005, the state of Texas has acknowledged that water spinach is a highly prized vegetable in many cultures, and has allowed it to be grown for personal consumption, in part because it is known to have been grown in Texas for more than 15 years and has not yet escaped cultivation. 

The genus Ipomoea also contains the sweet potato (I. batatas).  Though the term "morning glory" is not usually extended to I. batatas, sometimes it may be referred to as a "tuberous morning glory" in a horticultural context. Some cultivars of I. batatas are grown for their ornamental value, rather than for the edible tuber.

Chemistry and ethnobotany 

The seeds of many species of morning glory contain ergoline alkaloids such as the psychedelic ergonovine and ergine (LSA).  Seeds of Ipomoea tricolor and Turbina corymbosa (syn. R. corymbosa) are used as psychedelics. The seeds of morning glory can produce a similar effect to LSD when taken in large doses, often numbering into the hundreds. Though the chemical LSA is not legal in some countries, the seeds are found in many gardening stores; however, some claim the seeds from commercial sources can sometimes be coated in some kind of pesticide or methylmercury (although the latter is illegal in the UK and the US).

Gallery

References

Further reading 
  
 Furst, Peter (1990). Flesh of the Gods. .
 Schultes, Richard Evans (1976). Hallucinogenic Plants. Elmer W. Smith, illustrator. New York: Golden Press. .

External links 

 
 Erowid Morning Glory Vault
 Morning Glory Flowers is a book from 1854 

Convolvulaceae
Herbal and fungal hallucinogens
Natural sources of lysergamides
Plant common names